Playtime Is Over is the third studio album by English grime artist Wiley. It was released on Big Dada Recordings and was recorded in Bow, East London. The album was released on 4 June 2007, the same day as former protégée Dizzee Rascal's Maths + English, and reached 71 in the UK Album Chart. Playtime Is Over was the featured album on MySpace the week before its release.

It was apparently planned for release in the U.S. on 11 September 2007. On this album, Wiley also addresses a feud between himself and Dizzee Rascal with the song "Letter 2 Dizzee". Dizzee later replied with the song "Pussyole", which featured on his album Maths + English. "No Qualms", which samples Jme's 2006 song "Poomplex", is a response to Nasty Jack's "Pimp on Flows" diss track.

Critical reception

Track listing

Charts

References

External links
Playtime is Over at UK record shop

2007 albums
Wiley (musician) albums
Big Dada albums